The 2019 Monaco ePrix (formally the 2019 Monaco E-Prix) was a Formula E electric car race held at the Circuit de Monaco on 11 May 2019. It was the ninth race of the 2018–19 Formula E season and the third edition of the event.

Report

Background
The Monaco ePrix was confirmed to be returning to the Formula E calendar on 4 November 2018. It was the first time the race was held since 2017 as the event is held biennially, alternating with the Historic Grand Prix of Monaco. Originally, series founder and CEO Alejandro Agag had wanted to upgrade to using the full size Circuit de Monaco instead of the shorter version used in 2017 and 2015 centred around the Rainier III Nautical Stadium. However, plans for this fell through when the FIA objected to it in September 2018.

Going into the weekend, Virgin Racing's Robin Frijns lead the championship with 81 points, a 1 point lead over Techeetah's André Lotterer with BMW Andretti's António Félix da Costa down in 3rd with 70 points. In the team's standings, Techeetah lead with 142 points followed behind by Envision Virgin with 135 and defending constructors champions, Audi Sport Abt Schaeffler down in 3rd with 129.

After the  previous round in Paris, three drivers were left with three place grid penalties for qualifying for causing collisions. They were Jerome D'Ambrosio who collided with Frijns's team mate Sam Bird, Edoardo Mortara who collided with Jaguar's Alex Lynn and Oliver Rowland who collided with Alexander Sims.

Classification

Qualifying

Notes:
  – Oliver Rowland set the fastest time and received three points for pole position but received a three-place grid penalty for colliding with Alexander Sims in the Paris ePrix. Therefore, he started in third place and Jean-Éric Vergne started in pole position.
  – Oliver Rowland, Jérôme d'Ambrosio and Edoardo Mortara received three place grid penalties for causing a collision in the previous race in Paris
  – Mitch Evans received a 10-place grid penalty after a qualifying infringement and reached his third reprimand.
  – Maximilian Günther received a 10-place grid penalty after speeding under Full Course Yellow during FP1 and reached his third reprimand.

Race

Notes:
  – Daniel Abt received a drive through penalty converted into a 33-second time penalty for causing a collision.
  – António Félix da Costa originally finished sixth, but was disqualified for exceeding power usage over 200kW.
  – Pole position.
  – Fastest lap.

Standings after the race 

Drivers' Championship standings

Teams' Championship standings

 Notes: Only the top five positions are included for both sets of standings.

Notes

References

|- style="text-align:center"
|width="35%"|Previous race:2019 Paris ePrix
|width="30%"|FIA Formula E Championship2018–19 season
|width="35%"|Next race:2019 Berlin ePrix
|- style="text-align:center"
|width="35%"|Previous race:2017 Monaco ePrix
|width="30%"|Monaco ePrix
|width="35%"|Next race:2021 Monaco ePrix
|- style="text-align:center"

Monaco ePrix
Monaco ePrix
Monaco ePrix
Monaco ePrix